Dmitry Skrivanov (August 15, 1971, Novocherkassk, Skovorodinsky District) is a Russian political figure, deputy of the 7th and 8th State Dumas. 

In the 1990s, Skrivanov engaged in private legal practice in the economic sphere. On March 26, 2000, he was elected deputy of the Legislative Assembly of Perm Krai of the 2nd convocation. He was re-elected in 2001 and 2006. From 2008 to 2012, Skrivanov headed the United Russia branch in the Perm Krai. In 2016 and 2021, he was elected for the 7th and 8th State Dumas, respectively.

References

1971 births
Living people
United Russia politicians
21st-century Russian politicians
Eighth convocation members of the State Duma (Russian Federation)
Seventh convocation members of the State Duma (Russian Federation)